Hwang Woo-seul-hye (born Hwang Jin-hee on August 10, 1979) is a South Korean actress. She made her acting debut as a "dumb blonde"-type character in the critically praised black comedy Crush and Blush (2008). Hwang has since played leading roles in the indie melodrama Lovers Vanished (2010), the TV sitcom I Need a Fairy (also known as Sent from Heaven, 2012), and the romantic comedy Virgin Theory: 7 Steps to Get On the Top (2014).

Filmography

Film

Television series

Variety show

Awards and nominations

References

External links

 Hwang Woo-seul-hye at Huayi Brothers 
 
 
 
  

Living people
1979 births
Actresses from Seoul
21st-century South Korean actresses
South Korean film actresses
South Korean television actresses
Konkuk University alumni
Changwon Hwang clan